The 1956 Northeast Louisiana State Indians football team was an American football team that represented Northeast Louisiana State College (now known as the University of Louisiana at Monroe) in the Gulf States Conference during the 1956 NCAA College Division football season. In their third year under head coach Devone Payne, the team compiled a 8–2 record. In October, McNeese State announced it would forfeit all Gulf States games after an ineligable player competed to start the season. This included their October 20 victory over the Indians.

Schedule

References

Northeast Louisiana
Louisiana–Monroe Warhawks football seasons
Northeast Louisiana State Indians football